Ui-dong is a dong, neighbourhood of Gangbuk-gu in Seoul, South Korea. From June 30 of 2008, Former Suyu-4 dong is changed to the administrative dong. Thus Ui-dong can be called either legal dong or administrative dong.

See also 
Administrative divisions of South Korea

References

External links
Gangbuk-gu official website
Gangbuk-gu map at the Gangbuk-gu official website
 

Neighbourhoods of Gangbuk District